In the National Football League, the general manager (GM) of a team typically controls player transactions and bears the primary responsibility on behalf of the team during contract discussions with players.

The general manager is also normally the person who hires and fires the coaching staff, including the head coach.

The general manager will in many cases have oversight of the entire football department, typically reporting to the team president/CEO and/or owner. However, some teams have the GM act in advisory role with the head coach having oversight of the football operations (including the GM).

Some teams do not have official general managers, but instead have a de facto GM. Similar positions include President of Football Operations. Bill Belichick of the New England Patriots is an example of a coach who is the de facto general manager; he has never been officially named or granted the title of general manager but he has the final say in football operations.

Responsibilities 
The general manager typically will lead the scouting department of the football team. The scouting department’s role is to scout college players who are entering the NFL Draft each year. Many general managers start their tenure as a low-level scout in the scouting department and work their way up the ladder to either be promoted or hired to a different team as a general manager.

To prepare for the NFL Draft, general managers, along with the scouting department and coaching staff, will attend college games, the NFL Combine, and pro workout days to gain more knowledge on college players. During the NFL Combine, players will interview with the general manager and his team and are typically asked difficult questions to find if the player does well under stress. The NFL Combine is also a place for general managers to meet with other general managers of other teams to discuss potential trades of players.

The GM is also responsible for negotiating contracts and deals with a salary cap.

Along with the general manager, football teams usually have assistant coaches specifically for coaching certain positions. It is not feasible for the general manager to maintain close relationships with all of the assistant coaches, making it essential he work amiably and intimately with the head coach. Although the general manager has more authority, it is the head coach whom players generally look up to and who is most often in the public spotlight. This can create tension between a coach and general manager and has caused instability for some franchises. General Managers must attend meetings with the media and make statements on behalf of the team. Although general managers only have to work for about eight months out of the year, they work around 100 hours a week or more during the season.

References 

American football occupations
American football terminology